"21st Century Schizoid Man" is a song by the progressive rock band King Crimson from their 1969 debut album In the Court of the Crimson King. Often regarded as the group's signature song, it has been described by sources such as Rolling Stone as "a seven-and-a-half-minute statement of purpose: rock power, jazz spontaneity, and classical precision harnessed in the service of a common aim."

Lyrical content
The lyrics of "21st Century Schizoid Man" were written by Peter Sinfield and consist chiefly of disconnected phrases which present a series of images. All three verses follow a set pattern in presenting these images. The song criticizes the Vietnam War with the lyrics "Politicians' funeral pyre/Innocence raped with napalm fire". The line "Cat's foot, iron claw" is a reference to the French fable The Monkey and the Cat, while "death seed" in the final verse alludes to what Sinfield calls the "harvest of bad things" brought about by Agent Orange. The second line is a single image, often more specific than the first two, and the third line approaches an actual sentence. The fourth and last line of each verse is the song's title.

Before a live performance of the song on 15 December 1969, heard on the live album Epitaph, Robert Fripp remarked that the song was dedicated to "an American political personality whom we all know and love dearly. His name is Spiro Agnew."

Musical structure
Clocking at nearly seven and a half minutes, the song is notable for its heavily distorted vocals, sung by Greg Lake, and its instrumental middle section, called "Mirrors". Most of the song is in either 4/4 or 6/4 time, save for the end of the song, which culminates in two bursts of noisy, abstract free jazz inspired by Duke Ellington Orchestra. Fripp explained his guitar solo to Guitar Player magazine in 1974: "It's all picked down-up. The basis of the picking technique is to strike down on the on-beat and up on the off-beat. Then one must learn to reverse that. I'll generally use a downstroke on the down-beat except where I wish to accent a phrase in a particular way or create a certain kind of tension by confusing accents, in which case I might begin a run on the upstroke." The song encompasses the heavy metal, industrial, jazz-rock and progressive rock genres, and is considered to be an influence on the development of progressive metal. The dissonant and almost atonal solo, was rated number 82 in Guitar Worlds list of the Top 100 Greatest Guitar Solos in 2008. Louder Sound ranked the solo at No. 56 in its "100 greatest guitar solos in rock" poll.

Personnel
 Greg Lake – bass, lead vocals
 Ian McDonald – alto saxophone
 Robert Fripp – electric guitar
 Michael Giles – drums
 Peter Sinfield – lyrics

Sampling
Kanye West sampled the song on "Power", from his 2010 album My Beautiful Dark Twisted Fantasy. In a 2022 lawsuit by Declan Colgan Music Ltd, the owners of the mechanical licence for the song, they claimed that West had sampled it without a licence.

See also
 List of anti-war songs

References

Notes

King Crimson songs
1969 songs
Songs of the Vietnam War
Songs with lyrics by Peter Sinfield
Songs written by Robert Fripp
Songs written by Greg Lake
Songs written by Ian McDonald (musician)
Songs written by Michael Giles
Song recordings produced by Greg Lake
Island Records singles
Atlantic Records singles
1976 singles
Jazz fusion songs
British heavy metal songs
Song recordings produced by Ian McDonald (musician)